is an Apollo near-Earth asteroid roughly  in diameter. Ten days earlier, on 3 November 2017, the asteroid had passed  from Earth, but only had a solar elongation of 65 degrees.

2001 Earth approach 
Calculating the orbit backwards it is known that the asteroid made a close approach to Earth on 8 November 2001. The observation arc is only 118 days, but as the observation arc becomes longer the precise distance of the 2001 approach will become better constrained.

Notes

References

External links 
 
 
 

Minor planet object articles (unnumbered)
Discoveries by ATLAS
20171108
20171113